Şakir Bayhan (4 October 1938 – 15 February 2019) was a Turkish lexicographer, and forestry engineer. One of the unique lexicographers worked on Balcanian Languages, whose main profession is not linguistics.

Background
He was born in Bijelo Polje, Montenegro on 1938. He attended elementary school in this small town, under the pressure of German invasion during World War II

After completing his high school education, in Novi Pazar, Serbia, he emigrated from former Yugoslavia, where the suffering after-effects of the war were experienced during those days, to Turkey in 1959 with his family.

He graduated from Istanbul University, Faculty of Forestry in 1969 as a Forest Engineer M.Sc. Having graduated, he started to work as Head Forestry Engineer in the Turkish Ministry of Forestry and worked until his retirement in 2002

Lexicography Works

During his university years, he began to work on former Yugoslavian languages (Bosnian, Serbian, Croatian), which would become the basis of his future works and publications.

He continued his researches on West Balcanian Languages, during his military service between 1969 and 1970. In the following years, he prepared a  hand-written Serbian-Croatian / Turkish dictionary consisting of 15.000 words as the result of 9 years of work.
He began to work in cooperation with Turkish Language Association  in the early 2000s. This cooperation and hard work resulted in 2015 by the creation of a Bosnian / Turkish dictionary, having more than 30.000 words and 65.000 items and examples.

He also made many contributions to Balkanian Languages, in terms of discovering new-old words, idioms, synonyms with the cooperation of the lexicographers and language scientists, living either in Balcanian countries or the ones who emigrated to third countries years ago.

His publications are being used as citing sources for academic writing either by many linguists, lexicographers and academics or in articles regarding Balcanian culture, politics and the other issues. Besides his linguistic studies, he also worked for improving cultural relations between Montenegro and Turkey.

He died on February 15, 2019, in Ankara.

Publications 
 
 Turkish - Serbian / Serbian - Turkish Dictionary, 2004, 
 Turkish - Bosnian / Bosnian - Turkish Dictionary, 2006, 
 Turkish - Serbian / Serbian - Turkish Dictionary, Revised Second edition, 2010, 
 Turkish - Bosnian / Bosnian - Turkish Dictionary, Second Edition, 2011, 
 Turkish - Serbian / Serbian - Turkish Dictionary, Third Edition, 2012, 
 Bosnian - Turkish Dictionary, 2015, Turkish Language Association , 
 Bosnian - Turkish Dictionary, 2018, Revised Second Publication Turkish Language Association , 
 Bosnian /  Turkish Dictionary of Idioms, 2018,

External links
List of Turkish Governmental Language Association publications by Şakir Bayhan

References 
Turkish Language Associacion  

1938 births
2019 deaths
Forestry engineers
Turkish writers
Yugoslav emigrants to Turkey
20th-century Turkish engineers
21st-century Turkish engineers
20th-century lexicographers
21st-century lexicographers
Istanbul University alumni
People from Bijelo Polje